The 2022 Mount Olive Trojans men's volleyball team represents Mount Olive College in the 2022 NCAA Division I & II men's volleyball season. The Trojans, led by third year head coach Ali'i Keohohou, were picked to win the Conference Carolinas title in the coaches preseason poll, and they will host the 2022 Conference Carolinas men's volleyball tournament.

Season highlights
Will be filled in as the season progresses.

Roster

Schedule
TV/Internet Streaming information:
All home games will be streamed on Conference Carolinas DN. Most road games will also be televised or streamed by the schools television or streaming service.

 *-Indicates conference match.
 Times listed are Eastern Time Zone.

Announcers for televised games
George Mason: Alex Hayden
Queens: Mike Glennon
BYU: Spencer Linton, Steve Vail & Kiki Solano
BYU: Spencer Linton, Steve Vail, & Kiki Solano
North Greenville: Noah Frary
Belmont Abbey: Geoffrey Chiles
Barton: No commentary
King: Aidan Gilbride
Lees-McRae: Ruben van der Burg
Tusculum: Ruben van der Burg & Michael Deleo
Erskine: No commentary
Emmanuel: Logan Reese & Taylor Roberts
Belmont Abbey: Ruben van der Burg & Michael Deleo
North Greenville: Michael Deleo 
Barton: Michael Deleo & Ruben van der Burg
Emmanuel: Ruben van der Burg & Michael Deleo
Erskine: Ruben van der Burg
Queens: Michael Deleo & Ruben van der Burg
Lees-McRae: Michael Marsans
King: Brittany Ramsey & Julie Ward
Belmont Abbey: Michael Deleo
King:

References

2022 in sports in North Carolina
2022 NCAA Division I & II men's volleyball season
Standings